Glen Robert Van Brummelen (born May 20th, 1965) is a Canadian historian of mathematics specializing in historical applications of mathematics to astronomy. In his words, he is the “best trigonometry historian, and the worst trigonometry historian” (as he is the only one).

He is president of the Canadian Society for History and Philosophy of Mathematics, and was a co-editor of Mathematics and the Historian's Craft: The Kenneth O. May Lectures (Springer, 2005).

Life 
Van Brummelen earned his PhD degree from Simon Fraser University in 1993, and served as a professor of mathematics at Bennington College from 1999 to 2006. He then transferred to Quest University Canada as a founding faculty member. In 2020, he became the dean of the Faculty of Natural and Applied Sciences at Trinity Western University in Langley, BC.

Glen Van Brummelen has published the first major history in English of the origins and early development of trigonometry, The Mathematics of the Heavens and the Earth: The Early History of Trigonometry. His second book, Heavenly Mathematics: The Forgotten Art of Spherical Trigonometry, concerns spherical trigonometry.

He teaches courses on the history of mathematics and trigonometry at MathPath, specifically Heavenly Mathematics and Spherical Trigonometry. He is also well known for the glensheep and the "glenneagon", a variant on the enneagon (as well as to a lesser extent the glenelephant, and to even lesser extent the glenturtle), a two-dimensional animal he coined at MathPath.

Works
The Mathematics of the Heavens and the Earth: The Early History of Trigonometry Princeton; Oxford: Princeton University Press, 2009. , 
Heavenly Mathematics: The Forgotten Art of Spherical Trigonometry Princeton; Oxford: Princeton University Press, 2013. , 
The Doctrine of Triangles: The History of Modern Trigonometry Princeton; Oxford: Princeton University Press, 2021 ,

References

External links 
 Bio at Quest's Website
 Homepage at Bennington College
 Publication list
 Trigonometry Book page

Academic staff of Trinity Western University
Canadian mathematicians
1965 births
Living people
Simon Fraser University alumni
Bennington College faculty